Macrozamia fraseri is a species of plant in the family Zamiaceae. It is endemic to the south west of Western Australia, and restricted largely to the sandy soils of the Swan Coastal Plain and Geraldton Sandplains.  The range of Macrozamia fraseri overlaps that of Macrozamia riedlei. The Noongar peoples know the plant as djiridji.

Taxonomy 
The species was first described by Friedrich Anton Wilhelm Miquel.

Description 
The form of the species is a low-trunked cycad or upright tree, being highly variable. Leaves are dull and distinctly keeled, leaflets are medium or small. The species grows in low heath, without jarrah (Eucalyptus marginata), on sand. Macrozamia fraseri is typical of cycads in being slow-growing, perennial, evergreen and dioecious.  The trunk of old plants can be over a metre in height, with a surface burnt by bush fires of the past.

Macrozamia fraseri contains poisonous glycosides known as cycasins.

References

fraseri
Endemic flora of Western Australia
Cycadophyta of Australia
Least concern flora of Australia
Taxonomy articles created by Polbot